The following is a list of characters that first appeared on the Channel 4 soap opera Hollyoaks in 2001, by first appearance. The year saw the introduction of many new characters including the Hunter family.

Jason Cunliffe

Jason Cunliffe is a fictional character from the long-running Channel 4 soap opera Hollyoaks, played by Alex Reid. The character first appeared in 2001 and made his final appearance in 2002. In 2009, a tabloid newspaper reported that Reid was to return to the show, however a spokesperson confirmed that this was "absolute nonsense".

Jason Cunliffe is a footballer who lived the high life and always got what he wanted until he met Geri Hudson. Geri instantly fell in love with Jason, or rather for his status, and the pair became Hollyoaks' very own 'Posh and Becks'.

Geri wanted to marry Jason, however Jason had other things on his mind as he would often have regular affairs with his book publisher Alyson. He also made a pass at Geri's rival Izzy Cornwell, but Izzy would have none of it and told Geri what happened. Jason admitted what he had done but still the foolish Geri forgave him.

Eventually, though, Geri saw Jason's true colours when he had a night party in his mansion, despite agent Dion telling Jason to recover from his injury. During the night, Jason's team-mate Scott Anderson attempted to rape Geri and Jason failed to do anything about it. Realising that Jason treated her like a 'trophy', Geri decided to hit him where it hurt the most, in his pocket. Geri threatened Jason for him to marry her, or else she would tell the press what he was really up to. After getting married, Geri threw Jason out of the car, leaving him to realise that she was going to take him for every penny he was worth after what he had put her through. After feeling embarrassed the next episode Jason packed up and left Hollyoaks.

Brian Drake

Brian Drake is a goth who dated Zara Morgan. He was very religious and Zara pressured him to have sex. However, he didn't sleep with her. He then cheated on her with Steph Dean at a party at Tony Hutchinson's House. Brian became friends with Lisa Hunter and asked her to sing in his band. They ended up going out. When he found out about Lisa's self-harming, he tried to help, but in helping Lisa he neglected his revision and failed his GCSEs. Brian then stalked Lisa with threatening text messages. Lisa at first thought it was Cameron, but when she discovered it was Drake, he left the village, never to be seen again.

Dion

Dion is a football agent who took extreme measures to get what he wanted. Dion was Jason Cunliffe and Scott Anderson’s agent and had to keep the pair in line, making sure that they stayed out of trouble. However the pair did get themselves in deep trouble when they faced serious allegations. Scott had raped Beth Morgan, but in order to protect his reputation, he protested his innocence. But the major worry for Dion was Jason’s wife-to-be, Geri Hudson, who had been treated roughly by Jason and threatened to go to the press unless she received a large payment. Dion was clearly aware that if Jason paid Geri, he knew that would affect his payment as agent and therefore he would have to reach an agreement with Geri. In order to keep Geri sweet, Dion began to date Geri’s mother Jackie and warned Geri that he would tell her mother what she was really up to. Geri had the last laugh, however, after confessing to her mother and then failing to sign a contract agreement on her wedding day with Jason, which allowed Geri to take Jason for every penny he was worth. Dion failed to get what he wanted with Jason but managed to get the better of Beth Morgan during her trial against Scott. Despite Dion’s co-worker Alyson going against him and defending Beth, Scott was found not guilty, leaving Dion to get his own way.

Dan Hunter

Daniel Simon "Dan" Hunter is a fictional character on the long-running Channel 4 British television soap opera Hollyoaks. He was played by actor Andy McNair who made his first on-screen appearance in April 2001. The character was killed in a car explosion in 2004 after the actor quit.

Dan was the first Hunter to arrive in Hollyoaks, opening his own garage (later owning Dan's PitStop), followed by the rest of his family. Sensitive, yet extremely volatile and moody, Dan was extremely private about his life, which is why the first person he got involved with, Izzy Cornwell, did not last very long. She accused him of being on drugs and spread the gossip around college. In reality, he was not; instead he suffered from diabetes.

Dan's relationship with his family was strained at the best of times. He hated his selfish sister Ellie, but he did love her and care for her, did not understand his mother, clashed regularly with his father, had little in common with his brother Lee, but had a close, if overprotective, bond with little sister Lisa. Dan's family turned upside down when his brother Lee was failing his exams and getting in trouble, Lisa started to self-harm after she was bullied by Steph Dean and his sister Ellie disappeared in Ibiza for almost two years, but returned in 2002.

Dan was shy yet good-looking and fell for Debbie Dean the moment he saw her. The two were very much in love but were torn apart. Firstly he cheated on her after she had embarrassed him publicly by revealing she had taken his virginity, and when Dan was wrongly imprisoned for his brother-in-law, Toby Mills's killing spree. Dan was released after months in prison and was gutted to find Debbie had moved on. Dan and Debbie were not over each other and left it to the last minute to tell each other they loved each other, when moments later Dan's rally car exploded, killing him and leaving Debbie devastated. Soon after, she opened a present that Dan gave her earlier and this was an engagement ring.

Eve Crawford

Eve Crawford was a student at Hollyoaks Community College. She dated Jamie Nash and had a one-night stand with Matt Musgrove, but left the village after Becca Hayton reported Eve for stealing money.

Lee Hunter

Lee Hunter is a fictional character from the British Channel 4 soap opera Hollyoaks, played by Alex Carter. The youngest son of Les (John Graham Davies) and Sally Hunter (Katherine Dow Blyton), he made his first on-screen appearance on 13 May 2001. The character was described as "wayward", a "cheeky chap" and a "wheeler dealer". Carter announced his decision to quit the serial in 2005 to have more free time, filming his departure scenes in October 2005 and departed on-screen 23 December 2005.

Carter returned to Hollyoaks as a full-time character in September 2010, reintroduced by series producer Paul Marquess, although his comeback scenes aired in internet spin-off Hollyoaks: Freshers. Upon his return, the character has been described as "a tool", "confident" and "arrogant". In May 2011 it was announced Carter had quit again, in order to pursue other projects.

Lisa Hunter

Lisa Hunter is a fictional character from the long-running Channel 4 soap opera Hollyoaks, played by Gemma Atkinson. The character is noted for her storylines including bullying and self-harming. After her exit from Hollyoaks, Atkinson reprised the role twice in two spin-off series.

Les Hunter

Leslie "Les" Hunter is a fictional character from the long-running Channel 4 soap opera Hollyoaks, played by John Graham Davies.

Sally Hunter

Sally Hunter is a fictional character from the British Channel 4 soap opera Hollyoaks, played by Katherine Dow Blyton.

Becca Dean

Rebecca "Becca" Dean (née Hayton) is a fictional character from the British Channel 4 soap opera Hollyoaks, played by Ali Bastian. She debuted on-screen during episodes airing in 2001 and departed on 14 February 2007.

Bombhead

David "Bombhead" Burke is a fictional character from the long-running Channel 4 soap opera Hollyoaks, played by Lee Otway. Initially known as 'David Witherspoon', he appeared on the soap between 2001 and 2005. In 2010, Otway reprised the role in online spin-off Hollyoaks: Freshers. The character returned again on 13 January 2011 for two episodes.

Toby Mills

Tobias "Toby" Alexander Mills is a fictional character from the long-running British Channel 4 soap opera Hollyoaks, played by Henry Luxemburg.

Jodie Nash

Jodie Nash is a fictional character from the long-running Channel 4 soap opera Hollyoaks, played by Kate McEnery between 2001–2003.

Jamie Nash

Jamie Nash is a fictional character from the British Channel 4 soap opera Hollyoaks, played by Stefan Booth. The character appeared between 2001 and 2002.

Nick O'Connor

Nicholas "Nick" O'Connor is a fictional character from the long-running Channel 4 soap opera Hollyoaks, played by Darren Bransford. He made his first appearance in 2001 before being written out in 2004.

Scott Andersen

Scott Anderson is a fictional character from the British Channel 4 soap opera Hollyoaks, played by Daniel Hyde.

Theo Sankofa

Theo Sankofa is a fictional character from the long-running Channel 4 soap opera Hollyoaks, played by Andrew Somerville from 2001 to 2002.

Other characters

References

External links

, Hollyoaks
2001